Greg Dortch (born May 29, 1998) is an American football wide receiver for the Arizona Cardinals of the National Football League (NFL). He played college football at Wake Forest.

Early years
Dortch attended Highland Springs High School in Highland Springs, Virginia. He committed to Wake Forest University to play college football.

College career
Dortch redshirted his first year at Wake Forest in 2016. As a redshirt freshman in 2017, he played in eight games and had 53 receptions for 722 yards and nine touchdowns. As a redshirt sophomore in 2018, he had 89 receptions for 1,078 yards and eight touchdowns. He was named an All-American as a return specialist after recording two punt return touchdowns. After the season, Dortch decided to forgo the remaining two years of eligibility to pursue a career in the NFL.

Collegiate statistics

Professional career

New York Jets
Following the conclusion of the 2019 NFL Draft, Dortch signed with the New York Jets as an undrafted free agent. He was waived on September 1, 2019, and was re-signed to the practice squad.

Carolina Panthers
On October 16, 2019, the Carolina Panthers signed Dortch off the Jets practice squad to their active roster. He made his NFL debut in Week 9 against the Tennessee Titans. He was waived on November 11, 2019, and re-signed to the practice squad two days later. He was promoted to the active roster on December 6, 2019, but was waived four days later.

Los Angeles Rams
On December 12, 2019, Dortch was signed to the Los Angeles Rams practice squad. He signed a reserve/future contract with the Rams on December 31, 2019. He was waived on July 25, 2020.

Dortch visited the Tampa Bay Buccaneers on August 23, 2020.

Atlanta Falcons
On December 28, 2020, Dortch was signed to the Atlanta Falcons' practice squad. He signed a reserve/future contract on January 4, 2021. He was waived on June 17, 2021.

Arizona Cardinals
On August 3, 2021, Dortch signed with the Arizona Cardinals. He was waived on August 31, 2021, and re-signed to the practice squad the next day. He was promoted to the active roster on December 25. He finished the year with three receptions for 15 yards, in five appearances and two starts.

Due to injuries, Dortch began the 2022 season as a starter for the Arizona Cardinals. In the first game of the year against the Kansas City Chiefs, he recorded seven catches for 63 yards in the 44–21 loss. In the following game, a 29–23 overtime victory over the Las Vegas Raiders, he scored his first professional touchdown on a five-yard reception from Kyler Murray. In Week 11, against the San Francisco 49ers, he had nine receptions for 103 receiving yards in the 38–10 loss. In the 2022 season, he appeared in 16 games, of which he started four. He finished with 52 receptions for 467 receiving yards and two receiving touchdowns.

Dortch signed a one-year contract extension on March 10, 2023.

References

External links

Arizona Cardinals bio
Wake Forest Demon Deacons bio

1998 births
Living people
Players of American football from Richmond, Virginia
American football wide receivers
Wake Forest Demon Deacons football players
New York Jets players
Carolina Panthers players
Los Angeles Rams players
Atlanta Falcons players
Arizona Cardinals players